Dyella jiangningensis is a Gram-negative, aerobic and motile bacterium from the genus of Dyella with a polar flagellum which has been isolated from the surface of a rock from Nanjing in China.

References

Xanthomonadales
Bacteria described in 2013